Chlorogomphus is a genus of dragonfly in the family Chlorogomphidae.

The genus contains the following species:

References

Chlorogomphidae
Anisoptera genera
Taxa named by Edmond de Sélys Longchamps
Taxonomy articles created by Polbot